Narberth may refer to:

 Narberth, Pembrokeshire, a town in Wales
 Narberth Hundred, a traditional hundred of Pembrokeshire, Wales
 Narberth, Pennsylvania, a town in the US
 Narberth station (disambiguation), several stations